Rihtarovci is a small settlement on the right bank of the Mura River in the Municipality of Radenci in northeastern Slovenia.

References

External links
Rihtarovci on Geopedia

Populated places in the Municipality of Radenci